Morské oko may refer to two lakes:

Morské oko, Slovakia, lake in Slovakia
Morskie Oko, mountain lake in Poland